The 2018 Bangka Belitung Indonesia Masters was a badminton tournament which took place at Sahabudin Sports Hall in Pangkal Pinang, Indonesia, from 18 to 23 September 2018 and had a total purse of $75,000.

Tournament
The 2018 Bangka Belitung Indonesia Masters was the eighth Super 100 tournament of the 2018 BWF World Tour and also part of the Indonesia Masters Super 100 championships, which was held for the first time. This tournament was organized by the Badminton Association of Indonesia with the sanction from the BWF.

Venue
This international tournament was held at Sahabudin Sports Hall in Pangkal Pinang, Bangka Belitung Islands, Indonesia.

Point distribution
Below is the point distribution table for each phase of the tournament based on the BWF points system for the BWF Tour Super 100 event.

Prize money
The total prize money for this tournament was US$75,000. Distribution of prize money was in accordance with BWF regulations.

Men's singles

Seeds

 Ihsan Maulana Mustofa (champion)
 Sitthikom Thammasin (third round) 
 Iskandar Zulkarnain (second round) 
 Sony Dwi Kuncoro (withdrew)
 Panji Ahmad Maulana (quarter-finals)
 Shesar Hiren Rhustavito (semi-finals)
 Lin Yu-hsien (final)
 Firman Abdul Kholik (semi-finals)

Finals

Top half

Section 1

Section 2

Bottom half

Section 3

Section 4

Women's singles

Seeds

 Minatsu Mitani (champion)
 Fitriani (quarter-finals)
 Dinar Dyah Ayustine (first round)
 Deng Xuan (semi-finals)
 Sung Shuo-yun (first round)
 Yulia Yosephine Susanto (semi-finals)
 Chen Su-yu (second round)
 Sri Krishna Priya Kudaravalli (second round)

Finals

Top half

Section 1

Section 2

Bottom half

Section 3

Section 4

Men's doubles

Seeds

 Inkarat Apisuk / Tanupat Viriyangkura (first round)
 Akbar Bintang Cahyono / Muhammad Reza Pahlevi Isfahani (semi-finals)
 Keiichiro Matsui / Yoshinori Takeuchi (second round)
 Bảo Minh / Dương Bảo Đức (first round)
 Nipitphon Phuangphuapet / Nanthakarn Yordphaisong (quarter-finals)
 Chang Ko-chi / Lu Chia-pin (champions)
 Tarun Kona /  Lim Khim Wah (first round)
 Lu Chen / Ye Hong-wei (quarter-finals)

Finals

Top half

Section 1

Section 2

Bottom half

Section 3

Section 4

Women's doubles

Seeds

 Ayako Sakuramoto / Yukiko Takahata (champions)
 Nami Matsuyama / Chiharu Shida (final)
 Misato Aratama / Akane Watanabe (second round)
 Savitree Amitrapai / Pacharapun Chochuwong (second round)
 Miki Kashihara / Miyuki Kato (quarter-finals)
 Agatha Imanuela / Siti Fadia Silva Ramadhanti (quarter-finals)
 Pitha Haningtyas Mentari / Rosyita Eka Putri Sari (first round)
 Akane Araki / Riko Imai (semi-finals)

Finals

Top half

Section 1

Section 2

Bottom half

Section 3

Section 4

Mixed doubles

Seeds

 Akbar Bintang Cahyono / Winny Oktavina Kandow (first round)
 Chang Ko-chi / Cheng Chi-ya (semi-finals)
 Rinov Rivaldy / Pitha Haningtyas Mentari (champions)
 Nipitphon Phuangphuapet / Savitree Amitrapai (final)
 Alfian Eko Prasetya / Marsheilla Gischa Islami (first round)
 Rehan Naufal Kusharjanto / Siti Fadia Silva Ramadhanti (second round)
 Mohamad Arif Abdul Latif /  Rusydina Antardayu Riodingin (withdrew)
 Irfan Fadhilah / Pia Zebadiah Bernadeth (quarter-finals)

Finals

Top half

Section 1

Section 2

Bottom half

Section 3

Section 4

References

External links
 Tournament Link

Indonesia Masters Super 100
Bangka Belitung Indonesia Masters
Bangka Belitung Indonesia Masters
Bangka Belitung Indonesia Masters